Hans ("Hannes") Bongartz (born 3 October 1951) is a German football coach and former player.

Club career 
Bongartz was born in Bonn. He began his footballing career at SG Wattenscheid 09 and became a central midfielder to be reckoned with even before moving to FC Schalke 04 in 1974. He moved to 1. FC Kaiserslautern in 1978 where he was to finish his career in 1984. Altogether Bongartz played 298 Bundesliga games, scoring 39 goals.

International career 
Bongartz participated in the Euro 1976 in Yugoslavia. Bongartz won four caps for the West Germany national team.

Coaching career 
Bongartz later became the coach of Borussia Mönchengladbach and 1. FC Kaiserslautern. During the 2003–04 season Bongartz became the trainer of SG Wattenscheid 09. His best Bundesliga result as a manager is seventh place in 1987 with Kaiserslautern.

Honours
West Germany
 UEFA European Championship runner-up: 1976

Schalke 04
 Bundesliga runner-up: 1976–77

1. FC Kaiserslautern
 DFB-Pokal finalist: 1980–81

References

External links
 
 

1951 births
Living people
Sportspeople from Bonn
German footballers
Footballers from North Rhine-Westphalia
Association football midfielders
Germany international footballers
Germany B international footballers
UEFA Euro 1976 players
Bundesliga players
Bonner SC players
SG Wattenscheid 09 players
FC Schalke 04 players
1. FC Kaiserslautern players
German football managers
Bundesliga managers
1. FC Kaiserslautern managers
FC Zürich managers
SG Wattenscheid 09 managers
MSV Duisburg managers
Borussia Mönchengladbach managers
Sportfreunde Siegen managers